Juan Carlos Unzué Labiano (born 22 April 1967) is a Spanish football manager and former player who played as a goalkeeper.

As a player, he represented mostly Sevilla, for which he appeared in nearly 300 official games. He also spent two years with Barcelona, and played 318 La Liga matches in 17 seasons.

After retiring, Unzué went on to work extensively as a goalkeeper coach and a manager.

Playing career
Born in Pamplona, Unzué came through the ranks of hometown club CA Osasuna, but could not break into the first team. More of the same happened after he signed with La Liga giants FC Barcelona in 1988, as he was barred by Andoni Zubizarreta.

Joining Sevilla FC for 1990–91, Unzué blossomed as a top-flight player, rarely missing a match in his first five years. As the Andalusians were relegated at the end of the 1996–97 campaign, he moved to CD Tenerife for a further two seasons.

After two years at Real Oviedo as backup to local Esteban, his input consisting of seven Copa del Rey appearances, Unzué returned to his first club in summer 2001, being the starter in his debut season and second choice in his second. He retired from the game in June 2003 at age 36, after having helped his team reach the semi-finals in the domestic cup.

Coaching career
Unzué returned to the Camp Nou immediately after retiring, as the goalkeeping coach of the Frank Rijkaard-led side. After the Dutchman left, he retained his position under Pep Guardiola.

On 17 June 2010, after five years with Barcelona, Unzué had his first head coach experience, joining Segunda División team CD Numancia. One year later, he returned to his previous position, replacing Carles Busquets.

On 21 June 2012, Unzué was presented as Racing de Santander manager. On 13 August, however, he was dismissed following disagreements with the board of directors over the duration of his contract, and became Luis Enrique's assistant at RC Celta de Vigo the following 13 June.

Unzué returned to Barcelona on 15 July 2014, remaining as Luis Enrique's assistant. On 28 May 2017, he returned to managerial duties after being appointed at the helm of Celta for two seasons.

On 19 May 2018, after finishing in a disappointing 13th position, Unzué left Balaídos. On 13 June 2019, after more than a year without a club, he signed with recently relegated side Girona FC, being relieved of his duties on 21 October.

Personal life
Unzué's son, Jesús (born 1993), is also a footballer and a goalkeeper. He was a member of the Barcelona Juvenil squad which won the league and cup in 2011, but was unable to make the breakthrough to the professional level and moved on to local clubs such as CF Gavà and CE Júpiter.

Unzué's older son, Aitor, played as a midfielder in Tercera División (also with Gavà), and his niece Marta represented Barcelona.

In February 2020, Unzué was diagnosed with amyotrophic lateral sclerosis. On 18 June, one day before the league game between Sevilla and Barcelona in Seville and three days ahead of the International ALS/MND day, he made his condition public at a special press conference held at Camp Nou.

Managerial statistics

Honours
Barcelona
Copa del Rey: 1989–90
UEFA Cup Winners' Cup: 1988–89

Spain U20
FIFA U-20 World Cup runner-up: 1985

References

External links

1967 births
Living people
Footballers from Pamplona
Spanish footballers
Association football goalkeepers
La Liga players
Segunda División B players
CA Osasuna B players
CA Osasuna players
FC Barcelona players
Sevilla FC players
CD Tenerife players
Real Oviedo players
Spain youth international footballers
Spain under-21 international footballers
Basque Country international footballers
Spanish football managers
La Liga managers
Segunda División managers
CD Numancia managers
Racing de Santander managers
RC Celta de Vigo managers
Girona FC managers
FC Barcelona non-playing staff
People with motor neuron disease